Lynn Dumenil (October 9, 1950) is an American historian.

She received her BA degree from USC. She received her MA and Ph.D from UC Berkeley. She is currently the Robert Glass Cleland Professor of American History at Occidental College and a member of the Organization of American Historians.

Bibliography 

Freemasonry and American Culture, 1880-1930, Princeton University Press, 324p, 1984, 
The Modern Temper: American Culture and Society in the 1920s, Lynn Dumenil, Eric Foner, Hill & Wang Inc., U.S, 360p, 1995, 
America: A Concise History, James A. Henretta, Lynn Dumenil, David Brody, Study Guide, Bedford/st Martins, 1998, 
Through Women's Eyes: An American History With Documents, Lynn Dumenil, Ellen DuBois, Bedford Books, 808p, 2005, 
The Second Line of Defense: American Women and World War I, University of North Carolina Press, 360p, 2017,

References

External links
 

1950 births
Living people
21st-century American historians
University of Southern California alumni
University of California, Berkeley alumni
Occidental College faculty